Terror in the Sky is a 1971 television film remake of 1957's Zero Hour!, which itself was based on the 1956 television play Flight into Danger.  Arthur Hailey recycled the premise in his book Runway Zero-Eight which was co-written with John Castle in 1958. The film stars Doug McClure, Lois Nettleton, Roddy McDowall, Leif Erickson, Kenneth Tobey, and Keenan Wynn.

Plot
Passengers on a plane headed from the Midwest to the West Coast (Winnipeg to Vancouver in the book; Minneapolis to Seattle in the film) get quite ill after eating the chicken pot pie entree. Both pilots also eat the chicken. Passenger George Spencer, a man who has not flown since the Vietnam War (single-engine planes in the book, helicopter/war choppers in the film), is reluctantly pressed into flying the plane, where he makes an emergency landing.

Cast
Doug McClure - George Spencer
Leif Erickson - Marty Treleavan
Roddy McDowall - Dr. Baird
Lois Nettleton - Janet Turner
Keenan Wynn - Milton
Kenneth Tobey - Captain Wilson
Jack Ging - Controller
Sam Melville - Stewart
Leonard Stone - Harry Burdick

References

External links 
 

1971 television films
1971 films
American aviation films
American disaster films
CBS network films
Films directed by Bernard L. Kowalski
Films set on airplanes
Films about aviation accidents or incidents
Poisons
Films based on works by Arthur Hailey
1970s English-language films
1970s American films